Stare Koźle  (German Alt Cosel) is a village in the administrative district of Gmina Bierawa, within Kędzierzyn-Koźle County, Opole Voivodeship, in south-western Poland.

In the Silesian plebiscite of 20 March 1921 414 inhabitants voted to remain in Weimar Germany, 236 to join Poland.

The village has a population of 832.

Gallery

References

Villages in Kędzierzyn-Koźle County